Baranówka may refer to the following places in Poland:
Baranówka, Lublin Voivodeship (east Poland)
Baranówka, Lesser Poland Voivodeship (south Poland)
Baranówka, Otwock County in Masovian Voivodeship (east-central Poland)
Baranówka, Warmian-Masurian Voivodeship (north Poland)
Baranówka (Rzeszów) (district of Rzeszów), Podkarpackie Voivodeship (south-east Poland)

See also
Baranovka, Russia